Andrew "Andy" Holt is a fictional character from the British Channel 4 soap opera Hollyoaks, played by Warren Brown.

Storylines
On his arrival at Hollyoaks Community College, Andy appeared to be a charming, easy-going student. However, a dark side soon emerged. Andy took Sam Owen under his wing having impressed Sam with his easy confidence with women. The pair quickly became inseparable as Sam became enthralled with Andy, to dangerous consequence.

In the late night special Hollyoaks: Crossing The Line, Andy spiked Dannii Carbone’s drink with GHB in order to rape her. The next morning Andy convinced Danni that she had slept with him consensually. Sam was upset that Andy had slept with Dannii since she was dating his brother Russ Owen but he was won over by Andy's defense that he was unaware of their relationship. Andy went on to rape a series of women by drugging their drinks and seemed invulnerable to detection.

Eventually he confessed his crime spree to Sam but managed to convince his friend that the rapes were harmless fun, and even persuade him to get involved.

In another late night special Hollyoaks: No Going Back Andy drugged both Mel and Sophie Burton, and invited Sam to rape Sophie. While Andy raped Mel in her own home, Sam decided not to go through with raping Sophie, but told Andy that he had. Andy's crimes began to unravel as Dannii and the Burtons realised they had been victims of rape. However, Andy seemed more concerned with Sam's betrayal than his imminent detection.

The two men were discussing Sam's lies on a remote quarry when Russ tracked them down, intent on revenge for Dannii's rape. A brawl ended in Andy's fall from the top of the quarry. Sam and Russ worried they had killed him but he survived and became bent on vengeance. In Hollyoaks: Back from the Dead, Andy kidnapped Sam and Russ's younger sister Nicole Owen on the pretence of a romantic weekend away.

The pair tracked Andy and Nicole to a warehouse in Southport Pleasureland but were beaten and tortured by Andy. Sam's part in the drugging of the Burton sisters was revealed before Andy began to rape Nicole. His attack was interrupted by Melanie Burton who had spotted Andy while on a trip with Sam "O.B." O'Brien and followed him. Mel drugged Andy and questioned him about his crimes and although he managed to escape, as he ran from Mel he impaled himself on a spike, Mel stood emotionless and watched him die.

Andy's legacy touched the village 7 months later, when Sam Owen started a fire in The Dog In The Pond to get back at Sophie Burton for turning him over to the police for his part in the rapes.

Hollyoaks characters
Fictional rapists
Male villains
Television characters introduced in 2005
Fictional criminals in soap operas
Male characters in television